Krank Glacier is a glacier  long, flowing east to enter Helm Glacier just south of Mount Macbain in the Queen Elizabeth Range of Antarctica. It was named by the Advisory Committee on Antarctic Names for Joseph P. Krank, Weather Central meteorologist at Little America V Station in the winter of 1957.

References

Glaciers of the Ross Dependency
Shackleton Coast